Gary Carlson (born December 27, 1950) is the Iowa State Representative from the 91st District. A Republican, he has served in the Iowa House of Representatives since 2015.

References

External links 
 Gary Carlson at ballotpedia

1950 births
Living people
People from Cedar Falls, Iowa
People from Muscatine County, Iowa
Republican Party members of the Iowa House of Representatives
21st-century American politicians